The mixed doubles was one of four lawn tennis events on the Tennis at the 1906 Intercalated Games programme. The tournament was played on clay courts at the Athens Lawn Tennis Club. Frenchmen Marie Decugis and Max Decugis won the gold medal.

Uniquely, the silver and bronze medals were awarded on the basis of the best performance against the gold and silver medalists, instead of the usual losing finalist or winner of a play-off between the losing semi-finalists. 

Thus, Greek Aspasia Matsa and Xenophon Kasdaglis, who were beaten by the French team in the final, actually won the bronze medal. They won eight games, whereas Greeks Sophia Marinou and Georgios Simiriotis won nine games in their loss to the French team in the semifinal (accordingly,  they won the silver medal).

Draw

Draw

References

External links
  ITF, 2008 Olympic Tennis Event Media Guide
 Official results archive (ITF)

Tennis at the 1906 Intercalated Games